Firehouse, Engine Company 33 and Ladder Company 9 is a New York City Fire Department firehouse at 42 Great Jones Street in NoHo, Manhattan. It is the home of Engine Company 33 and Ladder Company 9. The building is a Beaux Arts structure built in 1899 by Ernest Flagg and W.B. Chambers.

History
Engine 33 Company was originally organized on Mercer Street in lower Manhattan on November 1, 1865, but then moved to its present location on June 1, 1899.  Ladder Company 9 was organized in 1865; its first house was on Elizabeth Street. It moved to 42 Great Jones Street in 1948. The Great Jones Street location was also the home of the Chief of Department for a time.

10 of the 14 firefighters from this house who responded to the World Trade Center were killed in the September 11 attacks.

Equipment

The first engine kept at 42 Great Jones was powered by steam and built by Clapp & Jones Manufacturing Company, Hudson, New York.  It was able to throw water 215 feet.

See also
National Register of Historic Places listings in Manhattan below 14th Street
List of New York City Designated Landmarks in Manhattan below 14th Street

References

External links 

FDNY Official Site
Official FDNY photos associated with Engine 33
NYFD.com Unofficial Site

Fire stations completed in 1899
Fire stations on the National Register of Historic Places in New York (state)
Fire stations in New York City
1899 establishments in New York City
Buildings and structures on the National Register of Historic Places in Manhattan
New York City Designated Landmarks in Manhattan